Deerfield Township may refer to the following places in the U.S. state of Minnesota:

 Deerfield Township, Cass County, Minnesota
 Deerfield Township, Steele County, Minnesota

See also
 Deerfield Township (disambiguation)
Minnesota township disambiguation pages